The Crowthers of Bankdam is a 1940 historical novel by the British writer Thomas Armstrong. His debut novel, it is a family saga following the fortunes of the Crowther family of Yorkshire mill owners across several generations from 1854. A popular success, it was followed by three sequels collectively known as the Crowther Chronicles.

Film adaptation
In 1947 it was adapted into the film Master of Bankdam, directed by Walter Forde and starring Anne Crawford, Dennis Price and Tom Walls.

References

Bibliography
 Goble, Alan. The Complete Index to Literary Sources in Film. Walter de Gruyter, 1999.
 Watson, George & Willison, Ian R. The New Cambridge Bibliography of English Literature, Volume 4. CUP, 1972.
 Young, Kenneth. The Second Bed Post: A Miscellany of The Yorkshire Post. Macdonald, 1964.

1940 British novels
Novels by Thomas Armstrong
British historical novels
Novels set in Yorkshire
Novels set in the 19th century
British novels adapted into films
William Collins, Sons books
1940 debut novels